The II Conference of Heads of State and Government of the CPLP, commonly known as the 2nd CPLP Summit (II Cimeira da CPLP) was the 2nd biennial meeting of heads of state and heads of government of the Community of Portuguese Language Countries, held in Praia, Cabo Verde, on 16-17 July 1998.

Outcome
At the 2nd CPLP Summit, the CPLP added 5 institutions as associate observers:
Instituto Camões, the Portuguese cultural and linguistic institute
Fundação Bial, philanthropic foundation of the Portuguese pharmaceutical company Bial
Fórum da Lusofonia
FELP

Executive Secretary
Marcolino Moco, former Prime Minister of Angola, was reelected in his position of Executive Secretary of the Community of Portuguese Language Countries.

References

External links
CPLP Summits official site

CPLP Summits